Donar's Oak (also Thor's Oak or, via interpretatio romana, Jove's Oak) was a sacred tree of the Germanic pagans located in an unclear location around what is now the region of Hesse, Germany. According to the 8th century Vita Bonifatii auctore Willibaldo, the Anglo-Saxon missionary Saint Boniface and his retinue cut down the tree earlier in the same century. Wood from the oak was then reportedly used to build a church at the site dedicated to Saint Peter. Sacred trees and sacred groves were widely venerated by the Germanic peoples.

Willibald's Life of Saint Boniface

According to Willibald's 8th century Life of Saint Boniface, the felling of the tree occurred during Boniface's life earlier the same century at a location at the time known as Gaesmere (for details, see discussion below).

Although no date is provided, the felling may have occurred around 723 or 724. Willibald's account is as follows (note that Robinson has translated robor Iobis, "tree of Jove", as "oak of Jupiter"):

Germanic tree and grove veneration
Sacred groves and sacred trees were venerated throughout the history of the Germanic peoples and were targeted for destruction by Christian missionaries during the Christianization of the Germanic peoples. Ken Dowden notes that behind this great oak dedicated to Donar, the Irminsul (also felled by Christian missionaries in the 8th century), and the Sacred tree at Uppsala (described by Adam of Bremen in the 11th century), stands a mythic prototype of an immense world tree, described in Norse mythology as Yggdrasil.

Location of Gaesmere
There are a few dissenting voices: in his 1916 translation of Willibald's Vita Bonifacii, George W. Robinson says "The location [of the tree] is uncertain. There are in Hesse several places named Geismar." Historian Thomas F. X. Noble (2000) describes the location of the tree felling as "still unidentified". In the late 19th century, folklorist and philologist Francis Barton Gummere identifies the Gaesemere of the attestation as Geismar, a district of Frankenberg located in Hesse.

However, most scholars agree that the site mentioned by Willibald is Geismar near Fritzlar. In 1897 historian C. Neuber placed the Donar Oak "im Kreise Fritzlar". While Gregor Richter, in 1906, noted that one scholar considered Hofgeismar as a possible location, he himself comments that most people consider Geismar near Fritzlar as the right place. Unequivocal identification of Geismar near Fritzlar as the location of the Donar Oak is found in the Catholic Encyclopedia, in teaching materials for religious studies classes in Germany, in the work of Alexander Demandt, in histories of the Carolingians, and in the work of Lutz von Padberg. The Reallexikon der Germanischen Altertumskunde notes that for Willibald it was probably not necessary to specify the location any further because he presumed it widely known. This Geismar was close to Büraburg, then a hill castle and a Frankish stronghold.

Role in Bonifatian hagiography and imagery
One of the focal points of Boniface's life, the scene is frequently repeated, illustrated, and reimagined. Roberto Muller, for instance, in a retelling of Boniface's biography for young adults, has the four parts of the tree fall down to the ground and form a cross. In Hubertus Lutterbach's fictional expansion of the Boniface correspondence, Boniface relates the entire event in a long letter to Pope Gregory II, commenting that it took hours to cut the tree down, and that any account that says the tree fell down miraculously is a falsification of history.

See also
 List of individual trees
 Capitulatio de partibus Saxoniae, a law code imposed by Charlemagne in 785 that prescribes death for Saxon pagans refusing to convert to Christianity
 Massacre of Verden, a massacre of 4,500 captive pagan Saxons ordered by Charlemagne in 782
 Caill Tomair, a grove dedicated to Thor destroyed by the forces of Brian Boru in early 1000

Notes

References

 Dowden, Ken (2000). European Paganism: The Reality of Cult from Antiquity to the Middle Ages. Routledge. 
 Emerton, Ephraim (2000). The Letters of Saint Boniface. Columbia University Press. 
 Gummere, Francis B. (1892). Germanic Origins: A Study in Primitive Culture. Charles Scribner's Sons.
 Levison, Wilhelm (1905). Vitae Sancti Bonifatii archiepiscopi moguntini. Monumenta Germaniæ historica: Scriptores rerum germanicorum in usum scholarum separatim editi. Hannover and Leipzig: Hahn.  (Latin)

 Robinson, George W. (trans.) (1916). The Life of Saint Boniface by Willibald. Harvard University Press.

External links

Individual oak trees
History of Catholicism in Germany
History of Hesse
Saint Boniface
Thor
Trees in Germanic paganism
Iconoclasm
Destroyed individual trees